The 2011 Kenyan Super Cup was the third edition of the tournament. The Kenyan football match, played on 20 February 2011, saw Ulinzi Stars, the 2010 Kenyan Premier League winners, face off against Sofapaka, the 2010 FKL Cup winners.

Sofapaka won the match 1-0 for their second consecutive title.

Match details

See also
2010 Kenyan Super Cup
2012 Kenyan Super Cup
Kenyan Premier League
FKF Cup

External links

Super Cup
2011